The United States Virgin Islands made its Paralympic Games début, as the Virgin Islands, at the 2012 Summer Paralympics in London, United Kingdom, from August 29 to September 9.

The islands' sole representative was Lee Frawley, in equestrian events. Frawley was born and raised in the US Virgin Islands, though she now lives in the United Kingdom.

Equestrian

See also
Summer Paralympic disability classification
Virgin Islands at the Paralympics
Virgin Islands at the 2012 Summer Olympics

Notes

Nations at the 2012 Summer Paralympics
2012
Paralympics